The Pirates of the Bois de Boulogne (French: Les Corsaires du Bois de Boulogne)  is a 1954 French comedy film directed by  Norbert Carbonnaux and starring Raymond Bussières, Annette Poivre and Christian Duvaleix.

Synopsis
A group of Parisians are very short of money and desperate. To attract attention they decide to become shipwrecked and make a raft from the wood of the Bois de Boulogne. Setting out from Saint Tropez they do not make it very far across the sea, but their plan is ultimately successful.

Cast 
 Raymond Bussières as Hector Colomb, street singer
 Annette Poivre as Adèle, singer of streets
 Christian Duvaleix as Cyprien, street singer
 Denise Grey as Mrs Grossac, wife of industrialist
 Véra Norman as Caroline Grossac, the girl
 Jean Ozenne as Marcel Grossac, the industrialist
 Sophie Sel as a servant of "Grossac"
 Jess Hahn as the American marine
 Mario David as the athlete
 Jacques Ary as gendarme
 Christian Brocard as the news vendor  (uncredited)
 Laure Paillette as the patroness of café (uncredited)
 Georges Lautner as amateur radio (uncredited)
 Louis de Funès as the commissar (uncredited)
 Olga Sminsky (uncredited)
 Monique Dutot (uncredited)
 Antonio Longard (uncredited)

References

External links 
 
 Les Corsaires du Bois de Boulogne (1954) at the Films de France

1954 films
French comedy films
1950s French-language films
French black-and-white films
Films directed by Norbert Carbonnaux
1954 comedy films
Films scored by Norbert Glanzberg
Films shot in Paris
Films set in Paris
1950s French films